The Marico barb (Enteromius motebensis) is a species of ray-finned fish in the  family Cyprinidae.
It is named after the Marico River and found only in South Africa.

Sources

External links 
 All The Species Of South African Freshwater Fish; Fish Species list

Enteromius
Freshwater fish of South Africa
Fish described in 1894
Taxa named by Franz Steindachner
Taxonomy articles created by Polbot